Lisa Benlon (July 9, 1953) is a former member of the Kansas House of Representatives, who represented the 22nd district. She served from 1991 to 2002 as a Republican. She then served as a Democrat from 2009 to 2011. Benlon ran for re-election in 2010, but was defeated by Republican Greg Smith.

Prior to her election to the House, Benlon served on the Shawnee City Council from 1988 to 1991. From 1973 to 1988 she worked as an accounting office manager.

Benlon is a volunteer with the Boy Scouts of American (1986–present) and has also served in the Lenexa Chamber of Commerce, Republican Women of Lexena, Shawnee Area Chamber of Commerce, and Young Men's Christian Association.

Committee membership
 Economic Development and Tourism (Ranking Member)
 Taxation
 Joint Committee on Economic Development
 Federal and State Affairs committees.

Major donors
The top 5 donors to Benlon's 2008 campaign:
1. Kansas Democratic Party $5,700 	
2. Benlon, Randy & Lisa $4,977 	
3. Kansans for Lifesaving Cures $1,000 	
4. Johnson County Democratic Central Cmte $1,000 	
5. Greater Kansas City Chamber of Commerce $1,000

References

External links
 Kansas Legislature - Lisa Benlon
 Project Vote Smart profile
 Kansas Votes profile
 Follow the Money campaign contributions:
 2008

Members of the Kansas House of Representatives
Living people
Kansas Republicans
Kansas Democrats
Women state legislators in Kansas
1953 births
20th-century American women politicians
20th-century American politicians
21st-century American women politicians
21st-century American politicians